The Upper East Region is located in north Ghana and is the third smallest of the 16 administrative regions in Ghana. It occupies a total land surface of 8,842 square kilometers or 2.7 per cent of the total land area of Ghana. The Upper East regional capital is Bolgatanga, sometimes referred to as Bolga. Other major towns in the region include Navrongo, Paga, Bawku and Zebilla.

Geography

Location and size
The Upper East Region is located in the north-eastern corner of Ghana and bordered by Burkina Faso to the north and Togo to the east. It lies between longitude 0° and 1° West, and latitudes 10° 30′N and 11°N. The region shares boundaries with Burkina Faso to the north, Togo to the east, Upper West Region to the west, and the Northern Region to the south. The Upper East Region is divided into 15 districts, each headed by a district chief executive.

Tourism

Parks
Paga Crocodile Pond
Sombo Bat Sanctuary
Jafiiri Sacred Royal Python Sanctuary

Recreation areas
Tongo rocks
Bongo Rocks
Tono Dam

Historic sites
Naa Gbewaa's shrine
Navrongo's mud-built church
Pikworo Slave camp

Festivals
The region plays host to many festivals throughout the year, most of which are either to bring a good planting season or celebrate the harvest.
 Samanpiid festival
Damba Festival (Mamprusi)
Gologo Festival
Fao Festival
Paragbiele Festival
Willa Festival
Zumbenti Festival
Feok festival builsa
 Zekula festival, By Bissa people
Boaram Festival
 Bolgatanga International Craft and Arts Festival Organized by TradeAID Integrated*
 Tengana festival, By the people of Balungu, Winkongo and Pwalugu
Ndaakoya festival, by the Frafra, Talensi and Nabdam speaking Communities.

Other tourist attractions
 Upper East Regional Museum
 Sirigu Pottery and Arts Center
 Bolga market - a market for farmers and livestock, held twice weekly.
Bolgatanga Craft Village

Demographics

Population
The center of population of the Upper East Region is located in its capital of Bolgatanga.

The population is primarily rural (79%) and scattered in dispersed settlements. The rural population was 87.1 percent in 1984 and 84.3% in 2000. There was, thus, a 2.8 percentage point reduction in the rural share of the population between 1984 and 2000 and a further 5.3 percent reduction between 2000 and 2010.

With only 21 per cent of the population living in urban areas, the region is the least urbanized in Ghana. In fact, together with Upper West, they are the two regions with a less than 20 per cent urban population.

Ghanaian citizen by birth, childhood or parenthood constitute 92.5 percent of the population of the Upper East region. Naturalized Ghanaian citizen constitute 5.3 percent.

Upper East Region has a total population of 1,301,221 in the 2021 Population and Housing Census.

Transportation
Three national highways – N2, N10, and N11 – and a few Regional highways such as the R113, R114, R116 and R181, serve the region.

The N10 originates from Yemoransa in the Central Region and connects through Kumasi in the Ashanti Region and terminates at Paga in the Upper East Region.  The national capital of Accra is also connected to the region by the N2 which terminates in Kulungugu in the Upper East Region. Both these national routes are connected by the N11 which links the regional capital of Bolgatanga to Bimpiela, also in the region.

Administrative divisions
The political administration of the region is through the local government system. Under this administration system, the region is divided into 15 MMDA's (made up of 0 Metropolitan, 4 Municipal and 11 Ordinary Assemblies). Each District, Municipal or Metropolitan Assembly, is administered by a Chief Executive, representing the central government but deriving authority from an Assembly headed by a presiding member elected from among the members themselves. The current list is as follows:

Education

Senior high schools

Bolga Girls Senior High School
Awe Senior High/Tech School	
Bawku Senior High/Tech School				
Bolgatanga Senior High School
Bongo Senior High School	
Chiana Senior High School
Fumbisi Senior High School
Gowrie Senior High Tech School		
Gambigo Day Community SHS		
Garu Day Community SHS		
Kongo Senior High School	
Kusanaba Senior High School
Navrongo Senior High School
Nabango Senior High 
Notre Dame Sem/ Senior High School	
Mirigu Community Day SHS	
O. L. L. Girls Senior High School
Paga Senior High School 
Queen Of Peace Senior High School	
Sandema Senior High/Tech School
Sandema Senior High School	
Sirigu Senior High School
St John's Integrated Senior High/Tech	
Tempane Senior High School	
Zamse Senior High/Tech School	
Zebilla Senior High/Tech School	
Zorkor Senior High School 	
St John's Integrated SHTS	
Zuarungu Senior High School
 Bawku Senior High School
Bawku Technical School

Tertiary Institutions
1). Bolgatanga Technical University
2). St. John Bosco's College of Education
3). Gbewaa College of Education, Pusiga
4). UDS (University for Applied Science & Technology), Navrongo.

Notable native citizens

References

https://www.modernghana.com/author/AbongoMashoodAjene

Sources
 
 GhanaDistricts.com
 /index.asp statsghana.gov.gh

 
Regions of Ghana
French-speaking countries and territories